Kaho may refer to:

Places
Kaho, Burkina Faso, a village in southern Burkina Faso
Kaho District, Fukuoka (嘉穂郡), a district in Fukuoka, Japan
Kaho, Fukuoka (嘉穂町), a town located in Kaho District
4284 Kaho, a main-belt asteroid
Kaho, India, a village in India-China border in Arunachal Pradesh

Other uses
Kaho (given name)
 Kaho (born 1991), Japanese actress
Kahō, a Japanese era (1094–1096)
Kaho Manufacturing, Japanese company
Simone Kaho (born 1978), New Zealand poet

See also
Kaho Naa... Pyaar Hai, a 2000 Bollywood blockbuster movie
Kahoʻolawe, the smallest of the eight main volcanic islands in the Hawaiian Islands